Parma Associazione Calcio suffered a major setback in the 2001–02 Serie A season after selling two of their key players in the summer of 2001, as goalkeeper and former youth-team product Gianluigi Buffon and French international Lilian Thuram both departed for Juventus. Parma had a disappointing league campaign, finishing in 10th place, but on the other hand they managed to win the Coppa Italia, beating Juventus 1–0 at home, before losing 2–1 away and winning on the away goals rule.

Players

Squad information

Transfers

Left club during season

Competitions

Serie A

League table

Results summary

Results by round

Matches

Coppa Italia

Round of 16

Quarter-finals

Semi-finals

Final

UEFA Champions League

Third qualifying round

UEFA Cup

First round

Second round

Third round

Fourth round

Statistics

Appearances and goals

|-
! colspan=14 style=background:#dcdcdc; text-align:center| Players transferred out during the season

Goalscorers

References

Parma Calcio 1913 seasons
Parma